Unification of the observable fundamental phenomena of nature is one of the primary goals of physics. The two great unifications to date are Isaac Newton’s unification of gravity and astronomy, and James Clerk Maxwell’s unification of electromagnetism; the latter has been further unified with the concept of electroweak interaction. This process of "unifying" forces continues today, with the ultimate goal of finding a theory of everything.

Unification of gravity and astronomy
The "first great unification" was Isaac Newton's 17th century unification of gravity, which brought together the understandings of the observable phenomena of gravity on Earth with the observable behaviour of celestial bodies in space.

Unification of magnetism, electricity, light and related radiation
The ancient Chinese observed that certain rocks (lodestone and magnetite) were attracted to one another by an invisible force. This effect was later called magnetism, which was first rigorously studied in the 17th century. But even before the Chinese discovered magnetism, the ancient Greeks knew of other objects such as amber, that when rubbed with fur would cause a similar invisible attraction between the two. This was also first studied rigorously in the 17th century and came to be called electricity. Thus, physics had come to understand two observations of nature in terms of some root cause (electricity and magnetism). However, further work in the 19th century revealed that these two forces were just two different aspects of one force—electromagnetism. 

The "second great unification" was James Clerk Maxwell's 19th century unification of electromagnetism. It brought together the understandings of the observable phenomena of magnetism, electricity and light (and more broadly, the spectrum of electromagnetic radiation). This was followed in the 20th century by Albert Einstein's unification of space and time, and of mass and energy. Later, quantum field theory unified quantum mechanics and special relativity.

This process of "unifying" forces continues today, and electromagnetism and the weak nuclear force are now considered to be two aspects of the electroweak interaction.

Unification of the remaining fundamental forces: theory of everything
This process of "unifying" forces continues today, with the ultimate goal of finding a theory of everything – it remains perhaps the most important of the unsolved problems in physics. There remain four fundamental forces which have not been decisively unified: the gravitational and electromagnetic interactions, which produce significant long-range forces whose effects can be seen directly in everyday life, and the strong and weak interactions, which produce forces at minuscule, subatomic distances and govern nuclear interactions. Electromagnetism and the weak interactions are widely considered to be two aspects of the electroweak interaction. Attempts to unify quantum mechanics and general relativity into a single theory of quantum gravity, a program ongoing for over half a century, have not yet been decisively resolved; current leading candidates are M-theory, superstring theory and loop quantum gravity.

References

Concepts in physics